Dil Ne Phir Yaad Kiya (English: The heart is remembering once again) is a 2001 Hindi language film directed by Rajat Rawail. It stars Vinay Anand, Pooja Batra, Govinda and Tabu.

Cast
Govinda as Prem
Tabu as Roshni Batra
Pooja Batra as Sonia Chopra / Khanna 
Vinay Anand as Rahul Khanna 
Faraaz Khan as Sanjeev Verma
Sadashiv Amrapurkar as Shri Chopra (Sonia's dad)
Kunika as Smta. Chopra  (Sonia's mom)
Kiran Kumar as Mahendra Pratap Khanna (Rahul's dad) 
Guddi Maruti as Komal Singh 
Tiku Talsania as Bobby Singh (Komal's husband)
Dinesh Hingoo as Trideep Nandan, Photographer 
Vrajesh Hirjee as Charlie

Music
Music by Aadesh Srivasatava and Uttam Singh. Sameer wrote the lyrics. 
"Dil Ne Phir Yaad Kiya" - Alka Yagnik, Sonu Nigam
"Duptta Sambhal Ke" - Kavita Krishnamurthy, Vinod Rathod
"Ye Mausam" - Kumar Sanu, Alka Yagnik
"Aaj Nachna" - Udit Narayan, Alka Yagnik
"Sare Shahar Me" - Lata Mangeshkar, Udit Narayan
"Chali Chali Re Gori" - Vinod Rathod, Alka Yagnik
"Kab Tak Yu Dil" - Udit Narayan, Alka Yagnik

References

External links
 
 

2001 films
2000s Hindi-language films
Films scored by Aadesh Shrivastava
Films scored by Uttam Singh
Indian romantic thriller films
2000s romantic thriller films